Federico Vismara (born 9 May 1983) is a retired Argentine professional footballer who played as a midfielder for Sarmiento.

Career
Vismara started in the system of Estudiantes in 2002. He remained with the Argentine Primera División team for two years, making a total of nine appearances in the process. Primera B Nacional side El Porvenir signed Vismara in 2004, with the midfielder subsequently appearing fifty-five times and scoring once in two seasons with them. A move to Aldosivi followed in 2006, prior to Vismara agreeing to sign for fellow second tier outfit Chacarita Juniors. He scored one goal in thirty-five appearances during 2008–09 as they won promotion to the Primera División. His first top-flight goal arrived in April 2010 against Lanús as the club were relegated.

On 30 June 2010, Vismara completed a move to Serie B side Ascoli. However, he departed in the following December after not appearing competitively for the Italian club; though was an unused substitute in August for a Coppa Italia tie with Lumezzane and for league matches with Grosseto and Modena. Vismara returned to his homeland in January 2011 after joining Rosario Central. Having spent two campaigns with them, Vismara left to join Instituto ahead of the 2012–13 Primera B Nacional season. He received twenty-two yellow cards and four red cards in 2012–13 and 2013–14. In total, he featured sixty-eight times for Instituto over that period.

July 2014 saw Huracán become Vismara's eighth senior club. He was selected seventeen times in continental competition throughout his second campaign, 2015, which included nine appearances in the Copa Sudamericana as Huracán finished as runners-up to Colombia's Santa Fe. He won the Copa Argentina and Supercopa Argentina whilst with Huracán. Vismara switched them for Racing Club in January 2016. Despite participating in fifteen games during 2016, the midfielder failed to make an appearance in either 2016–17 or 2017–18. Midway through the latter, Vismara rejoined Chacarita Juniors of Primera B Nacional.

In July 2019, Vismara joined Sarmiento. Although he had a contract until the end of 2022, Vismara confirmed on 18 May 2022 that he had retired from football.

Career statistics
.

Honours
Huracán
Copa Argentina: 2013–14
Supercopa Argentina: 2014

References

External links

1983 births
Living people
People from San Lorenzo Department
Argentine footballers
Association football midfielders
Argentine expatriate footballers
Expatriate footballers in Italy
Argentine expatriate sportspeople in Italy
Argentine Primera División players
Primera Nacional players
Estudiantes de La Plata footballers
El Porvenir footballers
Aldosivi footballers
Chacarita Juniors footballers
Ascoli Calcio 1898 F.C. players
Rosario Central footballers
Instituto footballers
Club Atlético Huracán footballers
Racing Club de Avellaneda footballers
Club Atlético Sarmiento footballers
Sportspeople from Santa Fe Province